Jessie Ellen Cadell (23 August 1844 – 17 June 1884) was an English novelist and orientalist who wrote stories set in India, where she lived for some time with her husband.

Biography
Cadell was born Jessie Ellen Nash in London on 23 August 1844. At an early age she accompanied her husband, a British Army officer, to India. She resided chiefly at Peshawar, and embodied her observations of frontier life in the novel Ida Craven (1876).

Under the tedium of cantonment life, Mrs. Cadell learnt Persian, and upon her return to England after the death of her husband devoted herself especially to the study of Omar Khayyam, the Persian astronomer and poet. Without seeking to compete with Edward FitzGerald's splendid paraphrase of Khayyam in its own line, Cadell contemplated a complete edition, and a more accurate translation. She visited numerous public libraries in quest of manuscripts, and published a portion of her research in an article in Fraser's Magazine in May 1879. Friedrich von Bodenstedt, when publishing his own German translation, bestowed the highest praise on Cadell's work, without any idea that he was criticising the production of a female writer. In addition to her translations of Khayyam, she planned to write a history of India.

Cadell was prevented from carrying out her plans by her declining health, and she died at Florence, Italy on 17 June 1884. The Athenaeum said after her death that "She was a brave, frank, true woman, bright and animated in the midst of sickness and trouble, disinterestedly attached to whatever was good and excellent, a devoted mother, a staunch and sympathising friend." A volume of her translations of the Rubaiyat of Omar Khayyam was published posthumously in 1899 by her friend Richard Garnett, and one of her relatives had her second novel, Worthy, published posthumously.

References 

1844 births
1884 deaths
Writers from London
English orientalists
English women novelists
19th-century English novelists
19th-century English women writers
19th-century English writers
English translators
19th-century British translators
Women orientalists
English women non-fiction writers